Derrick Gervin (born March 28, 1963) is an American former professional basketball player born in Detroit. He played in the National Basketball Association (NBA) and was the 1995 Israeli Basketball Premier League MVP, and a two-time top scorer in the Israel Basketball League, in 1996 and 1998.

Biography
A 6' 8" forward from University of Texas at San Antonio (UTSA), Gervin was selected by the Philadelphia 76ers in the 4th round (20th pick, 90th overall) of the 1985 NBA draft. He played two seasons (1989–1991) in the National Basketball Association (NBA) as a member of the New Jersey Nets. He averaged 8.8 points per game in 77 games.

He was the 1995 Israeli Basketball Premier League MVP, playing and averaging 27.0 points per game for Hapoel Gvat/Yagur. He was also a two-time top scorer in the Israel Basketball League, in 1996 and 1998.

Gervin's jersey was retired by UTSA in 2006. His older brother, George Gervin, played in the ABA from 1972 to 1976 and in the NBA from 1976 to 1986.

References

External links

UTSA honors Derrick Gervin at 3 p.m., Friday

1963 births
Living people
African-American basketball players
American expatriate basketball people in Argentina
American expatriate basketball people in Israel
American expatriate basketball people in Italy
American expatriate basketball people in the Philippines
American expatriate basketball people in Turkey
American men's basketball players
Basketball players from Detroit
Boca Juniors basketball players
Evansville Thunder players
Fort Wayne Fury players
Galatasaray S.K. (men's basketball) players
La Crosse Catbirds players
Maccabi Kiryat Motzkin basketball players
Magnolia Hotshots players
Martin Luther King High School (Detroit) alumni
New Jersey Nets players
Philadelphia 76ers draft picks
Philippine Basketball Association imports
Santa Barbara Islanders players
Small forwards
UTSA Roadrunners men's basketball players
21st-century African-American people
20th-century African-American sportspeople